Cédric Kuentz (born 15 November 1973) is a French former speed skater. He competed at the 1998 Winter Olympics and the 2002 Winter Olympics.

References

External links
 

1973 births
Living people
French male speed skaters
Olympic speed skaters of France
Speed skaters at the 1998 Winter Olympics
Speed skaters at the 2002 Winter Olympics
People from Chamonix
Sportspeople from Haute-Savoie